Amaze may refer to:

 Amaze (software), a digital accessibility technology
 Amaze Entertainment, a video game development company
 Honda Amaze, a car by Honda